= Mian Ghundi railway station =

Railway station in Pakistan

Coordinates: 30.054722°N 66.9775°E

General information
- Owner: Ministry of Railways

Other information
- Station code: MUI

History
- Former names: Great Indian Peninsula Railway
Location

Mian Ghundi railway station (Urdu: میاں گھونڈی ریلوے اسٹیشن) is located in Pakistan.

== See also ==
- List of railway stations in Pakistan
- Pakistan Railways
